Ghulam Begam Badshah is a 1973 Bollywood drama film directed by Jambu. The film stars Shatrughan Sinha, Moushumi Chatterjee and Anil Dhawan. The film was a remake of Tamil film Soodhattam.

Cast
Shatrughan Sinha as Thakur Pratap
Anil Dhawan as Thakur Gopal
Moushumi Chatterjee as Laxmi 
Kumud Chuggani as Kesar 
Sudesh Kumar as Shyam 
David as Thakur Balwant
Pinchoo Kapoor as Thakur Ranjeet
Sunder as Hanuman
Randhir as Munimji
Jagdeep as Harbhajan
Meena T. as Harbhajan's Wife
Jagdish Raj as Card Player
Leena Das as Dancer

Songs
All songs were penned by Rajendra Krishan.

Reception 
A critic from The States said that "Stars & Studios Ghulam, Begam, Badshah, is unconvincing as the title suggests".

References

External links
 

1973 films
1970s Hindi-language films
1973 drama films
Films scored by Kalyanji Anandji
Hindi remakes of Tamil films